The 1999 FIFA Confederations Cup was the fourth FIFA Confederations Cup, and the second organised by FIFA. The tournament was hosted by Mexico between 24 July and 4 August 1999.

It was won by Mexico, who beat Brazil 4–3 in the final. Mexico became the first host nation to win the FIFA Confederations Cup. The competition was to originally be held in three stadiums, in three cities in the country. However, since the stadiums in Monterrey were sponsored by a competing beer company other than the official advertiser, the city was left out of the tournament altogether. The tournament was originally scheduled for 8–20 January 1999, but was rescheduled by FIFA on 17 November 1998 to accommodate the scheduling of the participating European teams.

The tournament was organized in two groups of four teams, in which two teams from both groups advanced to the semi-finals.

Qualified teams
The tournament featured eight teams, representing the six continental confederations. Mexico qualified as both the host nation and the winners of the 1998 CONCACAF Gold Cup, so the CONCACAF berth was given to the United States. France also qualified automatically as winners of the 1998 FIFA World Cup, but they declined to participate; World Cup runners-up Brazil took their place, which meant Bolivia replaced Brazil as the CONMEBOL representatives, having finished as runners-up in the 1997 Copa América. The other four places went to the winners of the most recent continental competitions: Germany (UEFA), Saudi Arabia (AFC), Egypt (CAF) and New Zealand (OFC).

Venues
Matches were played at two venues: the Estadio Azteca in Mexico City served as the venue for matches in Group A, while the Estadio Jalisco in Guadalajara hosted matches in Group B. Each of the venues also hosted one of the semi-finals; the final was played at the Azteca and the third place play-off was played at the Jalisco.

Match referees

Africa
  Coffi Codjia
Asia
  Kim Young-joo
Europe
  Anders Frisk

North America, Central America and Caribbean
  Gilberto Alcalá
  Brian Hall
South America
  Ubaldo Aquino
  Óscar Ruiz

Squads

Group stage
All times CST (UTC−6).

Group A

Group B

Knockout stage

In the knockout stage, if a match was level at the end of normal playing time, extra time was played (two periods of 15 minutes each). If still tied after extra time, the match was decided by a penalty shoot-out to determine the winners.

Bracket

Semi-finals

Third place play-off

Final

Awards

Statistics

Goalscorers
Cuauhtémoc Blanco, Marzouk Al-Otaibi and Ronaldinho are the top scorers in the tournament with six goals each. Ronaldinho won the Golden Shoe award by having more assists than Blanco and Al-Otaibi. In total, 55 goals were scored by 29 different players, with none of them credited as own goal.

6 goals

 Ronaldinho
 Cuauhtémoc Blanco
 Marzouk Al-Otaibi

4 goals
 Alex

3 goals

 Zé Roberto
 José Manuel Abundis

2 goals

 Rôni
 Samir Ibrahim
 Miguel Zepeda
 Brian McBride

1 goal

 Limberg Gutiérrez
 Renny Ribera
 Marcos Paulo
 João Carlos
 Serginho
 Abdel Sattar Sabry
 Yasser Radwan
 Ahmed Hassan
 Michael Preetz
 Lothar Matthäus
 Pável Pardo
 Francisco Palencia
 Chris Zoricich
 Nawaf Al-Temyat
 Ibrahim Al-Shahrani
 Jovan Kirovski
 Ben Olsen
 Joe-Max Moore
 Paul Bravo

Tournament ranking

Notes

External links

FIFA Confederations Cup Mexico 1999, FIFA.com
FIFA Technical Report (Part 1) and (Part 2)

 
1999
1999
1999–2000 in Mexican football
1999–2000 in Saudi Arabian football
1999–2000 in German football
Brazil at the 1999 FIFA Confederations Cup
1999 in Bolivian football
1999 in New Zealand association football
1999 in American soccer
1999 in Egyptian sport
July 1999 sports events in North America
August 1999 sports events in North America
July 1999 events in Mexico
August 1999 events in Mexico
1999 in association football